Aydoğdu is a Turkish surname. Notable people with the surname include:

Abdullah Aydoğdu (born 1991), Turkish Paralympian goalball player
Deniz Aydoğdu (born 1983), Turkish footballer
Soner Aydoğdu (born 1991), Turkish footballer

Turkish-language surnames